Derwent Capital Markets was a pioneer in the use of social media sentiment analysis to trade financial derivatives. The company was founded in 2008 by co-owner Paul Hawtin. Derwent Capital Market's registered office is in London.

In February 2011 Derwent Capital Markets launched a hedge fund using Twitter for investment direction. An academic study by Johan Bollen (Indiana University), Huina Mao (Indiana University), and Xiao-Jun Zeng (University of Manchester) established the connection between emotion-related words appearing in Twitter posts and subsequent movements in the Dow Jones Industrial Average.

In May 2013, Paul Hawtin, the Founder of Derwent Capital Markets launched Cayman Atlantic , an investment management firm that uses real-time social media data such as Twitter to find valuable trading opportunities.

As of December 2017, the website no longer functions and the company has been struck off.

References

Financial Times Article May 2012
FT Article on the Twitter Fund
Bloomberg Feature

External links
Official Website
Einvestment Fund

Investment companies of the United Kingdom
Companies based in the City of Westminster